Salsuginibacillus kocurii is a Gram-positive, moderately halophilic, alkalitolerant, endospore-forming, rod-shaped and motile bacterium from the genus of Salsuginibacillus which has been isolated from sediments from Lake Chagannor in Mongolia.

References

 

Bacillaceae
Bacteria described in 2007